Roadie refers to support personnel who travel with a band on tour.

Roadie or roadies may also refer to:

Roadie (1980 film), a 1980 film starring Meat Loaf
Roadie (2011 film), a 2011 American comedy film
Roadies (TV series), an American television series created by Cameron Crowe airing on Showtime
MTV Roadies, a reality television show on MTV India
"Roadie", a song by Tenacious D from Rize of the Fenix
Road Dogg (born 1969), wrestler formerly known as "The Roadie"

See also
 
 Rhodie, expatriate Zimbabweans
 Rodi (disambiguation)
 Rody (disambiguation)
 Roady (disambiguation)
 Rhody (disambiguation)